Liquid mirror may refer to:
 A reflecting surface created by a liquid
 See also specular reflection
 Liquid-mirror telescope
 Liquid-mirror space telescope